Gnoien is an Amt in the district of Rostock, in Mecklenburg-Vorpommern, Germany. The seat of the Amt is in Gnoien.

The Amt Gnoien consists of the following municipalities:
Altkalen 
Behren-Lübchin 
Finkenthal 
Gnoien
Walkendorf

Ämter in Mecklenburg-Western Pomerania
Rostock (district)